General elections were held in Swaziland on 19 September 2008 to elect the members of the House of Assembly. It was the first election under the new constitution introduced in 2006, and the first time that foreign observers were allowed to monitor an election in the country.  It was observed by an Expert Team established by the Commonwealth Secretary-General at the request of the Elections and Boundaries Commission of Swaziland.  

On the day before the election, several union officials were arrested for attempting to block the border with South Africa at Oshoek for a pro-democracy protest.

Political parties remained banned in Swaziland, so all candidates for the 55 seats were independents. Following the election, King Mswati III was to appoint 10 more MPs. The National Assembly would then elect 10 members for the Senate, with the King appointing 20 more.

References

Elections in Eswatini
Swaziland
Election
Non-partisan elections